Euxestina is a genus of picture-winged flies in the family Ulidiidae.

References

Ulidiidae